750 Formula is a British racing formula for a two-seater sports/racers, regulated by the 750 Motor Club.

Originally, cars were  powered by the 750cc Austin Seven engine and the Seven chassis. Racing under this original formula regulations continues as a form of historic racing in the 750 Motor Club 750 Trophy Series.

Later, the Reliant engine was introduced, and since 2003 the 1108cc version of the Fiat FIRE engine is used.  

The formula thrives today with a 14-round championship which is closely contested with grids of over 20 cars.  750 Formula is believed to be the most cost-effective way to race today with a competitive season of racing costing around £3,000 to £4,000 inclusive of entry fees, running costs and travel and accommodation.

In addition to being the world's longest running formula, it continues to thrive as an outlet for amateur constructor/drivers to hone their craft.

Further reading 
 Stephens, P. J., Building and racing my "750", G. T. Foulis & Co., London, 1953.

External links
The 750 Formula Drivers Website
The 750 Formula Forum
The 750 Motor Club
A 750 formula constructor's blog 

Formula racing